There are over 56 genera of flowering plants estimated to contain at least 500 described species. The largest of these is currently the legume genus Astragalus (milk-vetches), with over 3,000 species.

The sizes of plant genera vary widely from those containing a single species to genera containing thousands of species, and this disparity became clear early in the history of plant classification. The largest genus in Carl Linnaeus' seminal Species Plantarum was Euphorbia, with 56 species; Linnaeus believed that no genus should contain more than 100 species.

Part of the disparity in genus sizes is attributable to historical factors. According to a hypothesis published by Max Walters in 1961, the size of plant genera is related to the age, not of the taxon itself, but of the concept of the taxon in the minds of taxonomists. Plants which grew in Europe, where most of the early taxonomy was based, were therefore divided into relatively small genera, while those from the tropics were grouped into much larger and more heterogeneous genera. Likewise, plants which shared common medicinal properties, such as the many species of Euphorbia, were united into a single genus, while plants of diverse uses, such as the grasses, were split into many genera. Where there were many classical names for groups of plants, such as in Apiaceae / Umbelliferae or Brassicaceae / Cruciferae, small genera were defined, whereas groups not subdivided by classical authors remained as larger genera, such as Carex. A number of biological factors also influence the number of species. For instance, the occurrence of apomixis allows the recognition of large numbers of agamospecies, and such taxa have helped to bolster genera such as Ranunculus and Potentilla.

The introduction of infrageneric taxa (such as the subgenus, section and series) in the 19th century by botanists including Augustin Pyrame de Candolle allowed the retention of large genera that would otherwise have become unwieldy. E. J. H. Corner believed that studying large genera might enable greater insights into evolutionary biology, and he concentrated his efforts on large tropical genera such as Ficus.

Largest genera
According to a 2004 analysis by the botanical taxonomist David G. Frodin, a total of 57 genera of flowering plants contain at least 500 species. It is clear that there are other genera with over 500 species, as the work of taxonomists continues. The actual numbers of species are imprecisely known, as many of the genera have not been the subject of recent monographs. For instance, estimates of the number of species in the orchid genus Pleurothallis range from 1,120 to 2,500. Genera from other groups of vascular plants, but which have similarly large numbers of species, include Selaginella, Asplenium and Cyathea.

References

.Largest Flowering Plant Genera
Largest Genera Of Flowering Plants
Largest genera of flowering plants